Müncheberg is a small town in Märkisch-Oderland, Germany.

Müncheberg may also refer to:
 Panzer Division Müncheberg, a German panzer division

People with the surname
 Joachim Müncheberg (1918 – 1943), German Luftwaffe fighter ace during World War II

See also 
 Münchberg
 Münchberg (surname)